Helvetia is a small unincorporated community in Washington County, Oregon. It is located in the Tualatin Valley along U.S. Route 26, 15 minutes west of Portland. It was named by Swiss immigrants to Oregon in the 19th century. Notable features are the church, cemetery, the Rice Mineral Museum, Helvetia Vineyards and Winery, which is co-owned by former U.S. Congresswoman Elizabeth Furse, Roloff Farms, and the Helvetia Tavern.

The reality television series Little People, Big World is set on Roloff Farms in Helvetia, making the location a popular tourist attraction. The Helvetia area is only a few miles from both the Intel and Nike headquarters campuses. It consists of heritage farms and million dollar estate properties. The area is part of Tualatin Valley Fire and Rescue's service area.

The Holcomb Creek Trestle, the longest wooden railroad bridge currently in use in the United States, is located in the Helvetia area.

References

External links

Swiss-American history
Unincorporated communities in Washington County, Oregon
Unincorporated communities in Oregon